Cynthia Lee Woodhead (born February 7, 1964), commonly known by her family nickname "Sippy", is an American former competition swimmer, world champion, Olympic medalist, and former world record-holder.  She won three gold medals at the 1978 World Championships, when she was only 14 years old, and set seven world records during her career.

Career
Woodhead received gold medals in the 200-meter freestyle, 4×100-meter freestyle, and medley relay, and two silver medals at the 1978 World Championships in Berlin when she was only 14 years old.

At the 1979 Pan American Games in San Juan, Puerto Rico, she received five gold medals.  She won the 100-, 200-, and 400-meter freestyle, as well as being part of the winning U.S. teams in the 4×100-meter freestyle and 4×100-meter medley relays.

Woodhead had qualified for six events at the 1980 Summer Olympics in Moscow, and was regarded to be among the favorites in the four individual distances, as she was ranked world number one in 100-, 200-, 400-, and 800-meter freestyle. Due to the American boycott of the Moscow Olympics however, she did not get the chance to participate.  This was a great disappointment for her, and she has said that the boycott may have triggered her later health problems.

In late 1981 and 1982, she suffered from several health problems—mononucleosis, a broken leg, and pneumonia.

Woodhead competed at the 1984 Summer Olympics in Los Angeles, where she received a silver medal in 200-meter freestyle, finishing behind compatriot Mary Wayte.

She broke the long course 50-meter freestyle world record, April 10, 1980, but the record was further improved by Jill Sterkel the same day.  She also broke the long course 200-meter freestyle world record, three times, in 1978 and 1979, her last result remained a world record until 1984.  She was also a member of the U.S. team that held the 4×100-meter freestyle relay world record from 1978 to 1980.

Awards

In 1979, Woodhead was named Swimming Worlds World Swimmer of the Year and was named USOC Sports Woman of the Year.  In 1994, she was inducted into the International Swimming Hall of Fame.

See also
 List of members of the International Swimming Hall of Fame
 List of Olympic medalists in swimming (women)
 List of University of Southern California people
 List of World Aquatics Championships medalists in swimming (women)
 World record progression 50 metres freestyle
 World record progression 200 metres freestyle
 World record progression 400 metres freestyle
 World record progression 4 × 100 meters freestyle relay

References

External links
 
 
 

1964 births
Living people
American female freestyle swimmers
World record setters in swimming
Olympic silver medalists for the United States in swimming
Pan American Games gold medalists for the United States
Pan American Games silver medalists for the United States
Sportspeople from Riverside, California
Swimmers at the 1979 Pan American Games
Swimmers at the 1983 Pan American Games
Swimmers at the 1984 Summer Olympics
USC Trojans women's swimmers
World Aquatics Championships medalists in swimming
Medalists at the 1984 Summer Olympics
Pan American Games medalists in swimming
Medalists at the 1979 Pan American Games
Medalists at the 1983 Pan American Games